Russian championship among amateur football clubs (III division) is the fourth overall tier of the Russian football league system. Sometimes it is called Amateur Football League, after the organization that holds the competition. The league has amateur/semi-pro status. At the end of each season ten teams are promoted from the Amateur Football League to the full professional Second Division, located one step above (even though often the winning teams voluntarily choose to stay in the AFL due to higher financial commitments in the Second Division). Bottom-ranked clubs in the first divisions of Moscow, Moscow Oblast, and Siberia may be or are relegated to the second (fifth tier). The league is divided into ten regional divisions. From 1994 to 1997 a professional fourth-level Russian Third League existed. Its teams moved back to amateur competition in 1998. For more details, see 1994 Russian Third League, 1995 Russian Third League, 1996 Russian Third League, 1997 Russian Third League. 
Current name: Russian Amateur Football Championship (LFK).

Far East
Champions:
1987 – FC Montazhnik Yakutsk
1991 – FC Lokomotiv Ussuriysk
1992 – FC Portovik Vladivostok
1994 – FC Voskhod Vladivostok
1995 – FC Rybak Starodubskoye
1996 – FC Portovik Vladivostok
1997 – FC Gornyak Raychikhinsk
1998 – FC Viktoriya Komsomolsk-on-Amur
1999 – FC Viktoriya Komsomolsk-on-Amur
2000 – FC Viktoriya Komsomolsk-on-Amur
2001 – FC Portovik Kholmsk
2002 – FC Neftyanik Nogliki
2003 – FC Portovik Kholmsk
2004 – FC Portovik Kholmsk
2005 – FC Portovik Kholmsk
2006 – FC Sakhalin Yuzhno-Sakhalinsk
2007 – FC Portovik-Energiya Kholmsk
2008 – FC LuTEK Luchegorsk
2009 – FC LuTEK-Energiya Luchegorsk
2010 – FC LuTEK-Energiya Luchegorsk
2012 – FC LuTEK-Energiya Luchegorsk
2012 – FC LuTEK-Energiya Luchegorsk (transitional)
2013 – FC LuTEK-Energiya Luchegorsk
2014 – FC Belogorsk
2015 – FC Dalstroyindustriya Komsomolsk 
2016 – FC Belogorsk
2017 – FC Nogliki
2018 – FC Nogliki
2019 – FC Nogliki

Siberia
Champions:
1991 – FC Metallurg Aldan (Group 1) / FC Neftianik Urai (Group 2)
1992 – FC Motor Prokopyevsk
1993 – FC Dorozhnik Uyar
1994 – FC Viktoriya Nazarovo
1995 – FC Yantar Seversk
1996 – FC Atom Zheleznogorsk
1997 – FC Sibiryak Bratsk
1998 – FC Reformatsiya Abakan
1999 – FC Olimpik Novosibirsk
2000 – FC Chkalovets-1936 Novosibirsk
2001 – FC Torpedo-Alttrak Rubtsovsk
2002 – FC Energis Irkutsk
2003 – FC Shakhta Raspadskaya Mezhdurechensk
2004 – FC Chkalovets Novosibirsk
2005 – FC Raspadskaya Mezhdurechensk
2006 – FC Raspadskaya Mezhdurechensk
2007 – FC Raspadskaya Mezhdurechensk
2008 – FC Dynamo Biysk
2009 – FC Dynamo Biysk
2010 – FC Raspadskaya Mezhdurechensk
2012 – FC Dynamo Biysk
2013 – FC Shakhta Raspadskaya Mezhdurechensk
2013 – FC Metallurg Novokuznetsk (transitional)
2014 – FC Restavratsiya Krasnoyarsk
2015 – FC Restavratsiya Krasnoyarsk
2016 – FC Restavratsiya Krasnoyarsk
2017 – FC Novokuznetsk
2018 – FC Novokuznetsk
2019 – FC Novokuznetsk

Ural and West Siberia
Champions:
1991 – FC Gornyak Kachkanar (as in Ural)
1998 – FC RTI Yekaterinburg
1999 – FC Titan Berezniki
2000 – FC Titan Berezniki
2001 – FC Lukoil Chelyabinsk
2002 – FC Tobol Kurgan
2003 – FC Metallurg Zlatoust
2004 – FC Tyumen
2005 – FC Tyumen
2006 – FC Magnitogorsk
2007 – FC Gornyak Uchaly
2008 – FC Torpedo Miass
2009 – FC Torpedo Miass
2010 – FC Torpedo Miass
2012 – FC Tobol Tobolsk
2013 – FC Metallurg Asha (transitional)
2013 – FC Metallurg Asha 
2014 – FC Metallurg Asha
2015 – FC Metallurg Asha
2016 – FC Ural-2 Yekaterinburg
2017 – FC Metallurg Asha
2018 – FC Metallurg Asha
2019 – FC Metallurg Asha

North West

Champions:
1991 – FC Lokomotiv Leningrad (as in North)
1998 – FC Oazis Yartsevo
1999 – FC Pskov
2000 – FC Svetogorets Svetogorsk
2001 – FC Kondopoga
2002 – FC Pikalyovo
2003 – FC Baltika-Tarko Kaliningrad
2004 – FC Lokomotiv St. Petersburg
2005 – FC Baltika-2 Kaliningrad
2006 – FC Apatit Kirovsk
2007 – FC Sever Murmansk
2008 – FC Torpedo St. Petersburg
2009 – FC Apatit Kirovsk
2010 – FC Khimik Koryazhma
2012 – FC Rus Saint Petersburg
2013 – FC Zvezda Saint Petersburg
2013 – FC Zvezda Saint Petersburg (transitional)
2014 – FC Karelia Petrozavodsk
2015 - FC Zvezda Saint Petersburg
2016 – FC Zvezda Saint Petersburg
2017 – FC Zvezda Saint Petersburg
2018 – FC Khimik Koryazhma
2019 – FC Market Sveta Saint Petersburg

Centre (Moscow)
Champions:
1998 – FC Spartak-Chukotka Moscow
1999 – FC Moskabelmet Moscow
2000 – FC Torpedo-ZIL Moscow (youth)
2001 – FC Mostransgaz Selyatino
2002 – FC Nosorogi Volodarskogo
2003 – FC Almaz Moscow
2004 – FC Presnya Moscow
2005 – FC Torpedo-RG Moscow
2006 – FC Zelenograd
2007 – FC Spartak-Avto Moscow
2008 – FC Spartak-Avto Moscow
2009 – FC Torpedo Moscow
2010 – FC KAIT-Sport Moscow
2012 – FC Prialit Reutov
2012 – FC Zelenograd (transitional)
2013 – FC Zelenograd 
2014 – FC Zelenograd 
2015 – FC Zelenograd
2016 – FC Troitsk
2017 – Rosich M
2018 – Rosich M
2019 – Rosich M
2020 – Rosich M
2021 –

Centre (Moscow Oblast)
Champions:
1997 – FC Gigant Voskresensk
1998 – FC Vityaz Podolsk
1999 – FC Krasnoznamensk-Selyatino
2000 – 
Group A – FC Vityaz Podolsk
Group B – CYSS Khimki
2001 – FC Reutov
2002 – FC Lobnya-Alla Lobnya
2003 – FC Lobnya-Alla Lobnya
2004 – FC Lokomotiv-Mosotryad No. 99 Protvino
2005 – 
Group A – FC Fortuna Mytishchi
Group B – FC Dmitrov
2006 – 
Group A – FC Znamya Truda Orekhovo-Zuyevo
Group B – FC Titan Klin
2007 – 
Group A – FC Istra
Group B – FC Senezh Solnechnogorsk
2008 – FC Avangard Podolsk
2009 – 
Group A – FC Zorkiy Krasnogorsk
Group B – FC Mytishchi
2010 – 
Group A – FC Podolye Voronovo
Group B – FC Oka Beloomut
2012 – 
Group A – FC Dolgoprudniy
Group B – FC Znamya Noginsk
2012 (Transitional) – 
Group A – FC Kolomna
Group B – FC Povarovo
2013 – FC Olimpik Mytishchi
2014 – FC Titan Klin
2015 – FC Lyubertsy
2016 – FC Olimpik Mytishchi
2017 – FC Kvant Obninsk
2018 – FC Lyubertsy
2019 – FC Olimp-2 Khimki
2020 – Legion
2021 –

Golden Ring
Champions:
1998 – FC Kovrovets Kovrov
1998 – FC Mashinostroitel Kirov
1999 – FC Severstal Cherepovets
2000 – FC Torpedo Vladimir
2001 – FC BSK Spirovo
2002 – FC Ratmir Tver
2003 – FC Volga Tver
2004 – FC MZhK Ryazan
2005 – FC Ryazanskaya GRES Novomichurinsk
2006 – FC Kooperator Vichuga
2007 – FC Kooperator Vichuga
2008 – FC Dynamo Kostroma
2009 – FC Kooperator Vichuga
2010 – FC Kooperator Vichuga
2012 – FC Kooperator Vichuga
2012 – FC Dynamo Kostroma (transitional)
2013 – FC Dynamo Kostroma 
2014 – FC Shinnik-M Yaroslavl
2015 – FC Dynamo Kostroma
2016 – FC Murom
2017 – FC Cherepovets
2018 – FC Fakel Kirov
2019 – FC Cherepovets

Chernozemye (South-West Region)
Champions:
1998 – FC Oskol Stary Oskol
1999 – FC Yelets
2000 – FC Salyut-Energia Belgorod
2001 – FC Magnit Zheleznogorsk
2002 – FC Tekstilshchik Kamyshin
2003 – FC Rotor-2 Volgograd
2004 – FC Lokomotiv Liski
2005 – FC Dynamo Voronezh
2006 – FC Torpedo Volzhsky
2007 – FC Zodiak Stary Oskol
2008 – FC Fakel-StroyArt Voronezh
2009 – FC MiK Kaluga
2010 – FC Yelets
2012 – FC Khimik Rossosh
2013 – FC Dynamo Bryansk
2013 – FC Vybor Kurbatov (transitional)
2014 – FC Energomash Belgorod
2015 – FC Rotor Volgograd
2016 – FC Atom Novovoronezh
2017 – FC Metallurg-Oskol Stary Oskol
2018 – FC Metallurg-OEMK Stary Oskol
2019 – FC Krasny

Privolzhye (Volga Region)
Champions:
1991 – FC Tekstilschik Isheyevka (Group 1) / FC Trikotazhnik Astrakhan (Group 2) (both as in Povolzhye)
1998 – FC Metallurg Vyksa
1999 – FC Yoshkar-Ola
2000 – FC Alnas Almetyevsk
2001 – FC Zenit Penza
2002 – FC Lokomotiv Nizhny Novgorod
2003 – FC Rubin-2 Kazan
2004 – FC Naberezhnye Chelny
2005 – FC Yunit Samara
2006 – FC Sokol-Saratov
2007 – FC Khimik Dzerzhinsk
2008 – FC RossKat Neftegorsk
2009 – FC Zenit Penza
2010 – FC Syzran-2003 Syzran
2012 – FC Spartak Yoshkar-Ola
2012 – FC Shakhtyor Volga-Olimpinets (transitional)
2013 – FC Shakhtyor Volga-Olimpinets 
2014 – FC Sergiyevsk
2015 – FC Sergiyevsk
2016 – FC Dzherzhinsk-TS
2017 – FC Torpedo Dimitrovgrad
2018 – FC Khimik-Avgust Vurnary
2019 – FC Khimik-Avgust Vurnary

South
Champions:
1996 – FC Avangard Kamyshin
1997 – FC Sudostroitel Astrakhan
1998 – FC SKA Rostov-on-Don
1999 – FC Signal Izobilny
2000 – FC Lokomotiv-Taym Mineralnye Vody
2001 – FC Nart Cherkessk
2002 – FC Mashuk Pyatigorsk
2003 – FC Aruan Nartkala
2004 – FC Avangard Lazarevskoye
2005 – FC Chernomorets Novorossiysk
2006 – FC Bataysk-2007
2007 – FC Nika Krasny Sulin
2008 – FC Abinsk
2009 – FC Malka
2010 – FC Biolog Novokubansk
2012 – FC Volgar Astrakhan
2013 – FC Dynamo Rostov-on-Don
2013 – FC Dynamo Sbornaya Stavropol (transitional)
2014 – FC SKA Rostov-on-Don
2015 – FC Volgar Astrakhan
2016 – FC Sbornaya RO Rostselmash 
2017 – FC Akhmat Khosi-Yurt Tsentaroy
2018 – FC Maras-IngGU Nazran
2019 – FC Aksay

External links
 
 РЕГИОНАЛЬНЫЙ ФУТБОЛ РОССИИ. regional-football.ru

4
Fourth level football leagues in Europe
Amateur association football